The G7 Teams or G7 Federation is an association of professional esports teams. It was originally formed by seven teams: 4Kings, fnatic, Made in Brazil, mousesports, Ninjas in Pyjamas, SK Gaming and Team 3D. Currently, the organization is made up of six members. The organization aims to promote the interest of the community and players to tournament organizers, sponsors, and other professional gaming institutions. The G7 teams have active presence in the advisory boards for both the World Series of Video Games and KODE5, and has relations with other tournament organizations, including the Cyberathlete Professional League, along with its players committee, and the Electronic Sports World Cup. The G7 teams also recognized in Zonerank as the official world esports rankings. In 2010, after a contract dispute between fnatic and SK Gaming, the organization dissolved.

Members

Founding members
 4Kings
 fnatic
 Made in Brazil
 mousesports
 Ninjas in Pyjamas
 SK Gaming
 Team 3D

Joined later 
 fnatic
 Made in Brazil
 mousesports
 SK Gaming
 Evil Geniuses (joined in September 2008)
 compLexity (ruled out in February 2008 due to joining the CGS, re-joined in early 2009)
 Ninjas in Pyjamas (dissolved in late 2007)
 Team 3D (ruled out in February 2008 due to joining the CGS)
 4Kings (ruled out due in September 2008 to inactivity)
 PGS Gaming (ruled out due in September 2008 to inactivity)
 wNv Teamwork (ruled out in February 2009)
 MeetYourMakers (dissolved in March 2009. Although re-founded later that year, MYM didn't rejoin G7)

Meetings
G7 has met once, on 19 January to the 21st, 2007 in Cologne, Germany. They plan on meeting annually. Among the subjects discussed were the selection of official games and change of league regulations. At the event it was also announced that the group would expand further and take in their first Asian team, wNv. The goal was to further enhance the connection with Asian eSport clubs and push forward the influence of world e-Sport.

References

External links
 The G7 Official Site
 Interview at GotFrag after the announcement of G7

Video game organizations
Defunct and inactive esports teams
Sports organizations established in 2007
Organizations disestablished in 2010